Through My Eyes may refer to:

 Through My Eyes (Erica Baxter album), 2007
 Through My Eyes (Fabrizio Sotti album), 2004
 Through My Eyes (Hunter Hayes album), 2000
 Through My Eyes (miniseries), 2004 Australian television crime drama